Badalona Pompeu Fabra is the name of a Barcelona Metro station in downtown Badalona, a municipality in the metropolitan area of Barcelona, served by metro line L2, and its northern terminus. Saveguarded plans for the extension of L1 also include this station. It's named after Pompeu Fabra, grammarian and political figure.

If the project is finally approved, it will be part of L13 as well. Construction started in October 2005 and was initially expected to be opened in 2007 under the working name Badalona Centre. However, the station wouldn't be inaugurated until 2010, due to controlled demolition problems and the discovery of Roman ruins in the area. Its platforms are over 100 m long and 9 m wide.

References

External links

Trenscat.com

Barcelona Metro line 1 stations
Barcelona Metro line 2 stations
Railway stations in Badalona
Railway stations in Spain opened in 2010